Angel Orensanz (born 1940 in Huesca) is a Spanish sculptor and painter who has lived in New York City since 1986.

He established the Angel Orensanz Foundation Center for the Arts, on the Lower East Side of Manhattan, in 1986.

Work by Angel Orensanz exists on several locations on the Barcelona Metro, including Passeig de Gràcia station and Zona Universitària station.

References

External links
 

Spanish painters
Spanish sculptors
Spanish male sculptors
1940 births
Living people